Oliver Marach and Michal Mertiňák were the defending champions, but Marach chose not to participate, and only Mertinak competed that year.
Mertinak partnered with Filip Polášek, but lost in the first round to Nicolas Devilder and Paul-Henri Mathieu.

Nicolas Devilder and Paul-Henri Mathieu won in the final 7–6(7–4), 6–7(9–11), [22–20], against Mariusz Fyrstenberg and Marcin Matkowski.

Seeds

Draw

Draw

External links
Draw

Doubles